The 2011–2012 El Hierro eruption occurred just off the island of El Hierro, the smallest and farthest south and west of the Canary Islands (an autonomous community of Spain), in the Atlantic Ocean off the coast of Africa. The island is also the youngest in the volcanic chain. Increased seismicity in June 2012 to the north-west of the vent did not result in another phase of eruptive activity. Until the 2021 La Palma eruption, which started on 19 September 2021, this was the last volcanic eruption in Spain.

Earthquakes
Beginning on 17 July 2011, increased seismic activity was detected by the Instituto Vulcanológico de Canarias (Volcanological Institute of the Canary Islands) and National Geographic Institute's seismic monitoring station located in Valverde. The seismic monitoring network was increased in density on 21 July to allow better detection and location of the seismic events. There was an earthquake swarm with in excess of 400 minor tremors between 20 July and 24 July; by 
27 July a further 320 earthquakes had been recorded. On 25 August there were reports that some horizontal deformation had been detected, but that there was no unusual vertical deformation. At that time, the total number of tremors had exceeded 4000. By the end of September, the tremors had increased in frequency and intensity, with experts fearing landslides affecting the town of La Frontera, and also a small possibility of a volcanic eruption through a new vent. In late September, emergency services evacuated several families in the areas at most risk, and made plans to evacuate the island if necessary.

Submarine eruption: October 2011 – March 2012

Between 4:15 and 4:20 am on 10 October 2011 the earthquake swarm changed behaviour and produced a harmonic tremor. Harmonic tremors are produced by magma movements and can indicate that an eruption has begun. That same day, patches of pale-coloured and sulphurous smelling water with dead fish were seen off the coast of La Restinga. A small submarine eruption had begun, 2 km south of La Restinga.

In early November, the 600 residents of La Restinga were evacuated for the second time. A confirmed surtseyan type of eruption phase started at the fissure on 7 November 2011. On 25 November 2011 the eruption was ongoing with vigorous phreatic bubbles emerging.

Several separate plumes of material, aligned N-S, were visible from the air, showing that the eruption was of a fissure type.

The main volcano on the island, Tanganasoga, underwent rapid inflation and increased carbon dioxide gas emissions, which were a cause for concern.  On 24 November there were various reports of a sulphurous smell in the El Golfo area of the island.

On 27 November the coast guard vessel Salvamar Adhara collected some pumice clasts, colloquially nicknamed 'floating lava bombs' or 'lava balloons', some of many that had been ejected by the underwater eruption and floated to the surface of the sea before sinking again.

In the following days, three scientific and seismic survey vessels studied the area: Sarmiento da Gamboa (bathymetry, gravity and mapping seismic profiles), Ramon Margalef (multibeam bathymetric survey, sediment sampling and the acquisition of echograms of the water column) and Cornide de Saavedra (physical and chemical evolution of the volcano stain).

On 21 December 2011 it was suggested that the eruption was subsiding, as the harmonic tremors and earthquakes are decreasing in frequency; however, in early January 2012 the earthquakes were increasing in frequency and the area of the eruption appeared to be increasing, with a wider area of sea producing the steaming pumice clasts, steam and general "jacuzzi" activity. By late February 2012 a decrease in seismicity, deformation and gas release was noted. In early March the authorities on El Hierro declared the eruption to be over; this was questioned by some vulcanologists. The webcams were taken down. Passive degassing of the underwater vent continued during 2012.

Climatic impacts of the October 2011 to March 2012 El Hierro submarine volcanic eruption were reported by Yim (2013).

June 2012 activity

Between 2 and 4 June 2012 seismic activity on the island again picked up, with small earthquake swarms indicating deep-seated magma movement below the island.  A period of quiet followed, with another period of earthquake swarms starting on 14 June.  Plotting of the earthquake epicentres showed that the magma was moving southwestwards across the central part of the island and under the area of the sea near the El Julan – La Dehesa area of the island, i.e. to the northwest of the submarine vent of 2011–2012.  Deformation of the island continued at a faster rate than that observed prior to the October 2011 eruption. Sensors measured that inflation of  height had taken place in the three days up to 27 June - a very fast rate of deformation.

September 2012 activity
In mid-September 2012 earthquake activity increased again.

Source of the magma
For the October 2011–March 2012 eruption, and the two phases of subsequent earthquake activity, plotting has shown that in all cases the magma rose under the area of Tanganasoga.  In the eruption it worked south-eastwards to near La Restinga; in the February upsurge in activity followed the same path.  Modelling of ground deformation measured with radar interferometry confirmed two shallow magma reservoirs, consistent with the migration of earthquakes epicenters. The June 2012 earthquake activity had the magma moving to the west of the island, and the current (mid-September) earthquake activity has shown that the magma moving south from Tanganasoga.

Naming of the volcano
In 2016, the underwater volcano was officially named Tagoro. The word comes from the Guanche language and means 'circular enclosure made of stones' or 'meeting place'. The name was suggested by the Instituto Español de Oceanografía (Spanish Oceanography Institute) to the Instituto Hidrográfico de la Marina (Navy Hydrography Institute), which is in charge of the naming of such geographical features.

See also 
 2021 Cumbre Vieja volcanic eruption
 1971 Teneguía eruption
 1949 Cumbre Vieja eruption

References

External links 
 "Xenopumices from the 2011–2012 submarine eruption of El Hierro (Canary Islands, Spain): Constraints on the plumbing system and magma ascent" GEOPHYSICAL RESEARCH LETTERS, VOL. 39, L17302, doi:10.1029/2012GL052675, 2012 (PDF) 
  NASA Earth Observatory image and article on the eruption
 Instituto Vulcanológico de Canarias page with many photos (in Spanish)
 4D model of earthquake swarm July to September 2011
  Global Volcanism Program, Smithsonian Institution
  James M. Day, et al.: Evidence for distinct proportions of subducted oceanic crust and lithosphere in HIMU-type mantle beneath El Hierro and La Palma, Canary Islands, 2010 (Science Direct, PDF)
  Martin J.R. Gee, et al.: Landslides and evolution of El Hierro in the Canary Islands, Marine Geology 177 (2001), 271-93 (PDF)
  M. R. Gee, et al.: Offshore continuation of volcanic rift zones, El Hierro, Canary Islands, Journal of Volcanology and Geothermal Research, 105 (2001), 107 - 119 (PDF)
  Longpre, M.; Troll, V.; Hansteen, T. H.; Anderson, E.: Ankaramitic Lavas and Clinopyroxene Megacrysts From the Tanganasoga Volcano, El Hierro Island (Canary Archipelago),	American Geophysical Union, Fall Meeting 2009, abstract #V51A-1662, Publication Date: 12/2009 (Abstract)
 N. A. Stroncik, et al.: The magmatic plumbing system beneath El Hierro (Canary Islands): constraints from phenocrysts and naturally quenched basaltic glasses in submarine rocks, Contrib Mineral Petrol (2009) 157:593–607, DOI 10.1007/s00410-008-0354-5 (PDF)
  J. J. Hernandez, et al.: Volcanic caves in El Hierro island, Canary Islands, Spain (PDF)
  J. de Nuez Pestana, e al.: Geology and volcanology of La Palma and El Hierro, western Canaries , Estudios geológicos, Vol. 57 no.56, 175-273 (Abstract)
  Serie Sísmica de El Hierro, Grupo de Investigación de Ingeniería Sísmica, Universidad de Madrid, act. 29.9.2011 (Spanish)
 Photo gallery of the El Hierro volcanic eruption. Instituto Geográfico Nacional, Madrid. Archived 2012-11-14. Retrieved 2018-10-26.

21st-century volcanic events
El Hierro
2011 in Spain
2012 in Spain
2011 disasters in Spain
2012 disasters in Spain
Volcanism of the Canary Islands
El Hierro
Volcanic eruptions in Spain
Submarine eruptions
Surtseyan eruptions